Black Codes (From the Underground) is an album by jazz trumpeter Wynton Marsalis that won two Grammy Awards in 1985: Best Instrumental Jazz Performance, Individual or Group and Best Jazz Instrumental Performance, Soloist.

Track listing

Personnel
 Wynton Marsalis – trumpet
 Branford Marsalis – tenor saxophone, soprano saxophone
 Kenny Kirkland – piano
 Charnett Moffett – double bass
 Jeff "Tain" Watts – drums
 Ron Carter - bass on "Aural Oasis"

Technical
 Steven Epstein – producer
 George Butler – executive producer
 Tim Geelan – chief engineer, remix engineer
 Stanley Crouch – liner notes

References

1985 albums
Columbia Records albums
Grammy Award for Best Jazz Instrumental Album
Post-bop albums
Wynton Marsalis albums
Albums produced by George Butler (record producer)